Noushijan is an archaeological site in the west of Iran near Malayer. According to excavations from this site this area was not inhabited earlier than 800 B.C.. The discovered features of this Tappe are as follows:

 a building in the west of the Tappe (the first fire temple)
 a columned hall (Apadana)
 a central temple (the second temple)
 rooms and storerooms
 a tunnel
 a rampart

Building in the west of Tappe 
According to the plan of the discovered building and according to the archaeological and architectural investigations, the building was built before Apadana. The entrance of the building is in its eastern side like a central temple. It has two connected space.

The inner space of the building is rectangular and its entrance is in the neighboring room. The rest of a coal bowl in the southern side of the main room proves, that the fire ceremony was carried out (secretly). It can be suggested that the first fire temple was in a covered space in Noushijan Tappe and undoubtedly the ceremony had a connection with the developing religious ceremony in the median era. On the southern and western wall, there are ruins of two niches with egg-shaped vaults.

Columned hall 
The hall was built on an adobe platform. Its foundation is from loam mortar. The hall is 20 m long and 15 m wide. Its eastern side is not completely right-angled. The central space of Apadana has three column rows. Each row has four columns. The space has totally twelve columns, which carried the heavy weight of ceiling. The columns were wooden. Each column had a diameter of 25 cm. The eastern wall has two decorative niches. but on the western side there is no decorations. Under the ceiling, there are some windows for lighting, which provides enough light for the space.

Main temple 
The main temple (or central temple) is an adobe semicircular octagon. This building is one of the most valuable median buildings.

Room and storerooms 
The second important building in Noushijan are the rooms and storerooms. The castle includes an enclosure wall, towers and four weapon storerooms. It is totally 25 m long and 22 m wide. The outer walls have 6 towers in the width and 7 towers in the length. The only entrance is in the middle of the eastern wall.

Tunnel 
In the northern part of Apadana, there is an artificial cellarlike pit, which leads to a rock in the depth of 3 m. This pit has stairs. Its height is 170 cm and its width is 180 cm. According to its form, it can be realized that the tunnel has never reached the end and because of unknown reasons it was abandoned incomplete. The tunnel was built in the last phase of region's inhabitation.

Rampart 
In the southern and eastern part of the room and storerooms there is a rampart, which encloses the buildings in the eastern part with a particular curve.

See also 

 Fire Temple of Noushijan

References 

Fire temples in Iran
Castles in Iran
Medes castles
Archaeological sites in Iran
Architecture in Iran
Hamadan Province
8th-century BC architecture
National works of Iran